

Wishart is a suburb in the Northern Territory of Australia located in Darwin about  east of Darwin City.

Wishart consists of land bounded by the Tiger Brennan Drive in the north, the Berrimah Road in the west and the Adelaide-Darwin Railway in the south.  The name is derived from Wishart Road which passes through the south part of the suburb and which is itself named after John Wishart, the contractor who built a wharf in Port Darwin from 1885–1886.  The suburb’s boundary and name were gazetted on 21 April 2004.

The 2016 Australian census which was conducted in August 2016 reports that Wishart had no people living within its boundaries.

Wishart is located within the federal division of Solomon, the territory electoral division of Spillett and the unincorporated area known as the Northern Territory Rates Act Area.

See also
List of Darwin suburbs

References

Suburbs of Darwin, Northern Territory
Places in the unincorporated areas of the Northern Territory